John Cooper Wiley (September 26, 1893 – February 3, 1967) was a United States Foreign Service officer and ambassador.

Career
Wiley was born in Bordeaux, France while his father served there as U.S. Consul.  He was educated by tutors, and studied at Union College, Columbia Law School, and Georgetown University Law Center.  While at Union College he joined the Theta chapter of the Psi Upsilon fraternity.

He entered the United States Foreign Service in 1915 and served in several positions in Europe and South America. In 1938 he was the Chargé d'Affaires ad interim in Austria and Envoy Extraordinary and Minister Plenipotentiary to Latvia and Estonia (the last ambassador before the Soviet occupation in 1940). He went on to appointments as Ambassador Extraordinary and Plenipotentiary to Colombia, Portugal, Iran, and Panama.

Retirement
He retired in 1953 and resided in the Georgetown area of Washington, D.C.  He died in Washington on February 3, 1967.  He was buried at Crown Hill Cemetery in Indianapolis.

Family
He was the son of Congressman John M. Wiley, and the grandson of John J. Cooper, who served as Indiana State Treasurer.  John Cooper Wiley was married to Irena Monique Baruch (1906-1972), a well-known sculptor and portrait painter.

Footnotes

Ambassadors of the United States to Austria
Ambassadors of the United States to Colombia
Ambassadors of the United States to Portugal
Ambassadors of the United States to Iran
Ambassadors of the United States to Panama
1893 births
1967 deaths
Ambassadors of the United States to Estonia
Ambassadors of the United States to Latvia
People from Georgetown (Washington, D.C.)
United States Foreign Service personnel
20th-century American diplomats
American expatriates in France